The 1992 Currie Cup Central / Rural Series was a rugby union competition held between the teams in the 1992 Currie Cup Central B and 1992 Currie Cup Rural A competitions, the third and fourth tiers of the premier domestic competition in South Africa. This formed part of the 54th Currie Cup season since the competition started in 1889.

Teams

Competition

There were nine participating teams in the 1992 Currie Cup Central / Rural Series, the five teams from the 1992 Currie Cup Central B competition and the four teams from the 1992 Currie Cup Rural A competition. These teams played the teams from the other league once over the course of the season, either at home or away. Teams received two points for a win and one points for a draw.

Log

Fixtures and results

Round one

Round two

Round three

Round four

Round five

Round six

Round seven

Round eight

Round nine

Round ten

See also
 1992 Currie Cup
 1992 Currie Cup / Central Series
 1992 Currie Cup Central A
 1992 Currie Cup Central B
 1992 Currie Cup Rural A & B
 1992 Currie Cup Rural B
 1992 Lion Cup

References

Central Rural Series